Criticality may refer to:

Physics terms
Critical phenomena, the collective name associated with the physics of critical points
Critical point (thermodynamics), the end point of a phase equilibrium curve
Quantum critical point, a special class of continuous phase transition that takes place at absolute zero

Nuclear-physics terms
Critical mass, referring to criticality in nuclear physics, when a nuclear reactor's fissionable material can sustain a chain reaction by itself
Criticality (status), a milestone in the commissioning of a nuclear power plant
Criticality accident, an uncontrolled nuclear chain reaction
Nuclear criticality safety, the prevention of nuclear and radiation accidents resulting from an inadvertent, self-sustaining nuclear chain reaction
Prompt critical, an assembly for each nuclear fission event

Other terms
Critical thinking, in education
Criticality index, in risk analysis
Criticality matrix, a representation (often graphical) of failure modes along with their probabilities and severities
Self-organized criticality, a property of (classes of) dynamical systems which have a critical point as an attractor